The Dartmouth–New Hampshire football rivalry, referred to as the Granite Bowl, is an American college football rivalry game played between the Dartmouth College Big Green and University of New Hampshire Wildcats. The two teams first met in 1901 and have played regularly since then. The longest gap between games was 22 years, between 1934 and 1956. Dartmouth was initially dominant, winning 17 of the first 19 games. Then New Hampshire won 18 of the next 19 games. New Hampshire leads the series 20–19–2, with the most recent game played in 2022 and the next game scheduled for 2023.

Game results

See also  
 List of NCAA college football rivalry games

References

College football rivalries in the United States
Dartmouth Big Green football
New Hampshire Wildcats football
1901 establishments in New Hampshire